Kachi, Kacchi, Kachhi or Katchi may refer to:

Places in Iran
 Kachi, Ardestan, a village in Isfahan Province
 Gachi, Fars, a village in Fars Province
 Keychi, Isfahan, a village in Isfahan Province

Places in South Asia 
 Kacchi Plain, an area in Balochistan, Pakistan
 Kacchi (Kalat), an ethnic Sindhi division of the former princely state of Kalat in Balochistan
 Kachhi District, a district in modern-day Balochistan, Pakistan
 Battle of Kachhi, fought in 1729
 Kachhi (Punjab), Pakistan
 Kachi, Haripur, a village in Khyber Pakhtunkhwa, Pakistan
 Kachi, old name of Kanchipuram city in Tamil Nadu, India

Other uses 
 Kutchi language, an Indo-Aryan language of Gujarat and Sindh
 Kutchi people
 Kachhi (caste), a caste of the Indian states of Madhya Pradesh, Rajasthan and Uttar Pradesh
 Kacchi, a variety of the Thali dialect of Pakistan
 "Katchi", a song by Nick Waterhouse and remixed by Ofenbach

People with the name 
 Hideo Kachi, (born 1953), Japanese musician
 Kachi A. Ozumba, Nigerian-born writer

See also 
 
 
 
 Kechi (disambiguation)
 Kutchi (disambiguation)
 Kachee, a community of Tibetan Muslims
 Cachi (disambiguation)
 Kkachi durumagi, traditional Korean overcoat